Catherine Malandrino is a French fashion designer. She resides between New York City and Paris.

Early life and education
Malandrino was born in Grenoble in the French Alps to Italian parents. She began her professional career in Paris after attending ESMOD.

Career
Malandrino moved from Paris to New York and met with Diane von Fürstenberg, who offered her the position of senior designer and creative director of the re-launched house. 

In 2001 Malandrino created the “Flag Collection”: ultra-feminine, jagged flag dresses inspired by the American flag. 

Malandrino has designed collections for Lacoste (2011) and for Kohl's (2013).

Writing 
In 2017 Malandrino published the book Une Femme Française.

External links 

 Catherine Malandrino collections (Vogue)

References

1963 births
Living people
Businesspeople from Grenoble
French women fashion designers